Batman and Me (1989) (with Tom Andrae) is the autobiography of comic book illustrator and writer Bob Kane, the co-creator of Batman.

As well as containing typical autobiographical material and examples of Kane's work throughout his career, it also reprinted several complete early Batman comic strips that had not been reprinted for nearly 50 years at the time of this publication.

Bibliography 
 Hardcover – 
 Paperback – 

1989 non-fiction books
Books about comics
American autobiographies
Batman in other media